Committed to a Bright Future is the fifth studio album by American metal band Dog Fashion Disco, released in 2003. Music videos were made for the songs "The Acid Memoirs","Grease" and "Love Song for a Witch".

Track listing

European release 
The European release of Committed contained the bonus track "China White". It is a re-recorded version of a song that originally appeared on Erotic Massage, but with a different outro. This version also contains "Grease" as track fifteen, instead of in the hidden time.
 

All songs written by Dog Fashion Disco except "Grease", written by Barry Gibb of the Bee Gees.

The song "Déjà Vu" is a version of song "En La Noche" from Experiments In Alchemy, but with alternate lyrics.
The track "Acid Memoirs" heavily references Timothy Leary, mentioning him by name and including the lyrics "Tuning in and dropping out"
"Pogo the Clown" (which originally appeared on Experiments in Alchemy) is about the infamous serial killer clown, John Wayne Gacy.

Personnel 
Todd Smith – vocals
Greg Combs – guitar
Stephen Mears – bass
Mike "Ollie" Oliver – drums (although he did not drum on the album)
John Ensminger – drums
Jeff Siegel – keyboards
Matt Rippetoe – saxophones, clarinet and flute (+ woodwind arrangements)

Additional personnel
Matt Rippetoe – Horns
Drew Mazurek – Producer, Engineer, Mixer
Joe Lambert – Mastering
Jeff Cohen – Legal Representation
Paul Campanella – Art Design & Layout
Angela Boatwright – Photography
Paul Cicoria – Title Design
Derek Brewer – Manager

Both Greg Combs and John Ensminger played on the album, but quit the band before it was released.

References 

2003 albums
Dog Fashion Disco albums